Nicolaus de Georgiis or Nicolaus de Zorzi (1574–1644) was a Roman Catholic prelate who served as Bishop of Hvar (1635–1644).

Biography
Nicolaus de Georgiis was born in Hvar, Croatia in 1574. On 12 February 1635, he was appointed during the papacy of Pope Urban VIII as Bishop of Hvar. On 4 March 1635, he was consecrated bishop by Giulio Cesare Sacchetti, Bishop of Fano, with Giovanni Delfino, Bishop Emeritus of Belluno, and Giovanni Thomas Marnavich, Bishop of Bosnia, serving as co-consecrators. He served as Bishop of Hvar until his death in 1644. While bishop, he was the principal co-consecrator of Girolamo Lucich, Bishop of Drivasto (1636).

References

External links and additional sources
 (for Chronology of Bishops)
 (for Chronology of Bishops)

17th-century Roman Catholic bishops in Croatia
Bishops appointed by Pope Urban VIII
1574 births
1644 deaths
History of Hvar